Aleksandar Radulović (born 13 January 1988) is a Serbian professional basketball player.

References

External links
 Eurobasket profile
 FIBA profile
 Realgm profile
 Balkanleague Profile
 Proballers Profile

1988 births
Living people
AZS Koszalin players
Basketball League of Serbia players
Basketball players from Belgrade
BC Brno players
KK Beovuk 72 players
KK Borac Čačak players
KK Crnokosa players
OKK Dunav players
KK Dynamic players
KK Mašinac players
KK Mladost Zemun players
KK Plana players
KK Sloboda Užice players
KK Teodo Tivat players
KK Železničar Inđija players
KK Žitko Basket players
KK Vojvodina players
Point guards
Serbian expatriate basketball people in Bosnia and Herzegovina
Serbian expatriate basketball people in the Czech Republic
Serbian expatriate basketball people in Montenegro
Serbian expatriate basketball people in Poland
Serbian men's basketball players